Tétrault or Tetrault may refer to:

Persons 
 Albany Tétrault, death at 85 ans, in 2010, founder of Albany Tétrault Meubles inc. of Saint-Hyacinthe (Québec, Canada), spouse of Réjane Jacques.
 Alfred Tétrault, renowned tailor in the city of Quebec, who crafted the suit of "Bonhomme Carnaval" and effigy which is the official passport of Carnaval de Québec (Québec Carnaval) since the inception of the festival in 1955.
Daniel Tetrault (born 1979), Canadian professional ice hockey defenceman.
 Lisa Tetrault, Ph.D., associate professor at the University of Wisconsin-Madison professor. Author of several books published on the affirmation of women in the United States.
Nicolas Tétrault, politician and entrepreneur in Montreal, Quebec, Canada
Oza Tétrault (May 1, 1908 - October 17, 1995), manager and politician in Quebec, Canada and a Member of the House of Commons of Canada (father of Roland Tétrault)
Roland Tétrault, maire de 1976 à 1980 et de 1992 à 2000, à Val d'Or, Abitibi-Témiscamingue, Québec, Canada, son of Oza Tétrault; politician and Member of the National Assembly of Quebec (Canada).
 Rick Tetrault, Master Carver.  Canadian currently living in Mexico. 
 Samuel Tétrault, champion figure skater, winner of two Canadian titles in novice and junior level, with its sporty partner Jessica Dubé

Enterprises 
 Cabinet McCarthy-Tétrault, in Québec, in Canada and London, England.
 Firme Rivet, Robillard & Tétrault, in Québec, in Canada.
 Albany Tétrault Inc Meubles et Electroménagers (Furniture and Appliances), in Saint-Hyacinthe, in Québec, in Canada.
 Tetrault Tire Center of Eureka, California

Toponyms 
Canada (Québec)
 Boulevard Tétrault, Val-d'Or (city), La Vallée-de-l'Or Regional County Municipality, Abitibi-Témiscamingue.
 Tétrault lake, Saint-Zénon (Municipality), Matawinie Regional County Municipality, Lanaudière.
 Tétrault street, Brossard (city), Longueuil, Montérégie.
 Tétrault street, Saint-Mathias-sur-Richelieu (Municipality), Rouville Regional County Municipality, Montérégie.
 Tétrault street, McMasterville (Municipality), La Vallée-du-Richelieu Regional County Municipality, Montérégie.
 Tétrault street, sector LaSalle, Quebec, Montréal.
 Tétrault street, sector Saint-Laurent, Montréal.
 Tétrault stream, Bromont (city), Brome-Missisquoi Regional County Municipality, Montérégie.
 Tétrault stream, Saint-Barnarbé-Sud (Municipality), Les Maskoutains Regional County Municipality, Montérégie.
 Chemin du Lac-Tétrault (road), Saint-Zénon (Municipality), Matawinie Regional County Municipality, Lanaudière.
 Stream of discharge Tétrault-Blanchet, Saint-Charles-sur-Richelieu (Municipality), La Vallée-du-Richelieu Regional County Municipality, Montérégie.
 Tétrault-Breault stream, Dunham (city), Brome-Missisquoi Regional County Municipality, Montérégie.

Elsewhere
 Tetrault Lake, near Eureka, Montana.
 Tetrault Woods State Forest, North Dakota

See also
Tétreault
Thériault